Sweden's entry at the 2000 Summer Olympics in Sydney, Australia consisted of 150 competitors (98 men and 52 women) who took part in 92 events in 22 sports.

Medalists

Archery

Athletics

Men's track

Men's field

Women's field

Wheelchair racing (demonstration)

Badminton

Beach volleyball

Canoeing

Men

Women

Cycling

Road cycling

Diving

Equestrianism

Dressage

Eventing

Jumping

Fencing

Football

Summary

Women's tournament

Team Roster

 Malin Andersson
 Kristin Bengtsson
 Sara Call
 Linda Fagerström
 Sara Johansson
 Caroline Jönsson
 Ulrika Karlsson
 Sara Larsson
 Hanna Ljungberg
 Åsa Lönnqvist
 Hanna Marklund
 Malin Moström
 Tina Nordlund
 Cecilia Sandell
 Therese Sjögran
 Victoria Svensson
 Malin Swedberg
 Ulla-Karin Thelin
 Jane Törnqvist
 Karolina Westberg

Group stage

Handball

Summary

Judo

Modern pentathlon

Rowing

Men

Women

Sailing

Sweden won one bronze medal and competed in nine Sailing events at the 2000 Sydney Olympics.

Men's Mistral
 Fredrik Palm
 Race 1 — (30)
 Race 2 — 21 
 Race 3 — (30)
 Race 4 — 2 
 Race 5 — 12 
 Race 6 — 14 
 Race 7 — 26 
 Race 8 — 22 
 Race 9 — 25 
 Race 10 — 28 
 Race 11 — 15 
 Final — 165 (23rd place)

Men's Single Handed Dinghy (Finn)
 Fredrik Lööf
 Race 1 — (17)
 Race 2 — 5 
 Race 3 — 1 
 Race 4 — 6 
 Race 5 — 7 
 Race 6 — 4 
 Race 7 — 4 
 Race 8 — (22)
 Race 9 — 2 
 Race 10 — 11 
 Race 11 — 7 
 Final — 47 (Bronze medal)

Men's Double Handed Dinghy (470)
 Johan Molund and Mattias Rahm
 Race 2 — 10 
 Race 3 — 7 
 Race 4 — (30) OCS
 Race 5 — 2 
 Race 6 — (29)
 Race 7 — 1 
 Race 8 — 4 
 Race 9 — 19 
 Race 10 — 20 
 Race 11 — 15 
 Final — 96 (12th place)

Women's Single Handed Dinghy (Europe)
 Therese Torgersson
 Race 1 — 16 
 Race 2 — 14 
 Race 3 — (23)
 Race 4 — 20 
 Race 5 — 18 
 Race 6 — 22 
 Race 7 — 20 
 Race 8 — 21 
 Race 9 — 17 
 Race 10 — 11 
 Race 11 — (23)
 Final — 159 (22nd place)

Women's Double Handed Dinghy (470)
 Lena Carlsson and Agneta Engström
 Race 1 — (18)
 Race 2 — 13 
 Race 3 — 2 
 Race 4 — 10 
 Race 5 — 6 
 Race 6 — 9 
 Race 7 — 14 
 Race 8 — 4 
 Race 9 — 2 
 Race 10 — 11 
 Race 11 — (19)
 Final — 71 (9th place)

Open Laser
 Karl Suneson
 Race 1 — 10 
 Race 2 — 5 
 Race 3 — 3 
 Race 4 — 24 
 Race 5 — 19 
 Race 6 — 17 
 Race 7 — 8 
 Race 8 — 14 
 Race 9 — (44) OCS
 Race 10 — (44) OCS
 Race 11 — 7 
 Final — 107 (14th place)

Open Two Handed Keelboat (Star)
 Mats Johansson and Leif Möller
 Race 1 — (12)
 Race 2 — (16)
 Race 3 — 9 
 Race 4 — 12 
 Race 5 — 9 
 Race 6 — 11 
 Race 7 — 9 
 Race 8 — 8 
 Race 9 — 10 
 Race 10 — 7 
 Race 11 — 10 
 Final — 85 (13th place)

Open Three Handed Keelboat (Soling)
 Magnus Augustson, Johan Barne and Hans Wallen
 Round Robin Group 2 — (3-2) 3 points — Did not advance

Open High Performance Two Handed Dinghy (49er)
 John Harrysson and Patrik Sandeström
 Race 1 — 9 
 Race 2 — 16 
 Race 3 — 13 
 Race 4 — (18) DSQ
 Race 5 — 15 
 Race 6 — 15 
 Race 7 — 15 
 Race 8 — 14 
 Race 9 — 12 
 Race 10 — 15 
 Race 11 — 15 
 Race 12 — 16 
 Race 13 — (18) OCS
 Race 14 — 14 
 Race 15 — 15 
 Race 16 — 18 DNF 
 Final — 202 (17th place)

Shooting

Men

Women

Swimming

Men

Women

Table tennis

Taekwondo

Men

Tennis

Triathlon

Wrestling

Greco-Roman

See also
Sweden at the 2000 Summer Paralympics

Notes

Wallechinsky, David (2004). The Complete Book of the Summer Olympics (Athens 2004 Edition). Toronto, Canada. . 
International Olympic Committee (2001). The Results. Retrieved 12 November 2005.
Sydney Organising Committee for the Olympic Games (2001). Official Report of the XXVII Olympiad Volume 1: Preparing for the Games. Retrieved 20 November 2005.
Sydney Organising Committee for the Olympic Games (2001). Official Report of the XXVII Olympiad Volume 2: Celebrating the Games. Retrieved 20 November 2005.
Sydney Organising Committee for the Olympic Games (2001). The Results. Retrieved 20 November 2005.
International Olympic Committee Web Site

References

Nations at the 2000 Summer Olympics
2000
Olympics